Bobby Reynolds (June 27, 1931 – August 19, 1985) was an American football player known among University of Nebraska Cornhuskers fans as "Mr. Touchdown".  He was elected to the College Football Hall of Fame in 1984.

Playing career
Reynolds attended Grand Island High where he played both basketball and football, winning state team titles in 1947 and 1948 in both sports. He attended the University of Nebraska–Lincoln where he became a First-Team All-American in 1950. A shoulder separation, broken leg, and lime-in-the-eye infection slowed him down the following two seasons. However, Reynolds still set then career records for scoring and rushing.

To promote the 1950 song "Mr. Touchdown, U.S.A.", RCA offered a prize of a television set and a silver-plated album to the college football player who scored the most touchdowns during the 1950 football season. Reynolds ultimately claimed the prize, which was presented to him by Hugo Winterhalter in February 1951. Reynolds, who was well known among Nebraska fans for his 1950 season, was thereafter described as "Mr. Touchdown".

Later life and death
Reynolds was inducted into the College Football Hall of Fame in 1984. 

In August 1985, Reynolds suffered a cerebral hemorrhage, dying two days later.

See also
 List of NCAA major college football yearly scoring leaders

References

1931 births
1985 deaths
Nebraska Cornhuskers football players
College Football Hall of Fame inductees
People from Grand Island, Nebraska
Players of American football from Nebraska